Ipeľské Úľany, formerly Fedymeš is a village and municipality in the Levice District in the Nitra Region of Slovakia.

History
In historical records the village was first mentioned in 1259.

Geography
The village lies at an altitude of 345 metres and covers an area of 15.68 km2. It has a population of about 340 people.

Ethnicity
The village is approximately 90% Magyar and 10% Slovak.

Facilities
The village has a public library and football pitch.

Genealogical resources

The records for genealogical research are available at the state archive "Statny Archiv in Banska Bystrica, Slovakia"

 Roman Catholic church records (births/marriages/deaths): 1788-1894 (parish A)

See also
 List of municipalities and towns in Slovakia

External links
https://web.archive.org/web/20071027094149/http://www.statistics.sk/mosmis/eng/run.html
 http://www.ipelskeulany.sk/
Surnames of living people in Ipelske Ulany

Villages and municipalities in Levice District
Hungarian communities in Slovakia